Jeon Hyeok-jin (born 13 June 1995) is a Korean badminton player.  Specializing in singles, he was runner-up at the 2013 Asian Junior Badminton Championships.  He was part of the Korean team that won men's team gold at the 2014 Asian Games and the following year, he beat both Chou Tien-chen and compatriot Son Wan-ho to win gold at the 2015 Summer Universiade. In 2017, he helped the Korean national team to win the world team championships at the Sudirman Cup.

Achievements

East Asian Games 
Men's singles

Summer Universiade 
Men's singles

Asian Junior Championships 
Boys' singles

BWF World Tour (1 title) 
The BWF World Tour, which was announced on 19 March 2017 and implemented in 2018, is a series of elite badminton tournaments sanctioned by the Badminton World Federation (BWF). The BWF World Tour is divided into levels of World Tour Finals, Super 1000, Super 750, Super 500, Super 300, and the BWF Tour Super 100.

Men's singles

BWF Superseries (1 runner-up) 
The BWF Superseries, which was launched on 14 December 2006 and implemented in 2007, was a series of elite badminton tournaments, sanctioned by the Badminton World Federation (BWF). BWF Superseries levels were Superseries and Superseries Premier. A season of Superseries consisted of twelve tournaments around the world that had been introduced since 2011. Successful players were invited to the Superseries Finals, which were held at the end of each year.

Men's singles

  BWF Superseries Finals tournament
  BWF Superseries Premier tournament
  BWF Superseries tournament

BWF Grand Prix (2 titles, 1 runner-up) 
The BWF Grand Prix had two levels, the Grand Prix and Grand Prix Gold. It was a series of badminton tournaments sanctioned by the Badminton World Federation (BWF) and played between 2007 and 2017.

Men's singles

  BWF Grand Prix Gold tournament
  BWF Grand Prix tournament

BWF International Challenge/Series (1 title, 1 runner-up) 
Men's singles

  BWF International Challenge tournament
  BWF International Series tournament

References

External links 
 

1995 births
Living people
Sportspeople from Ulsan
South Korean male badminton players
Badminton players at the 2014 Asian Games
Asian Games medalists in badminton
Asian Games gold medalists for South Korea
Medalists at the 2014 Asian Games
Universiade gold medalists for South Korea
Universiade medalists in badminton
Medalists at the 2015 Summer Universiade
21st-century South Korean people